Vishwa Jit Gupta (sometimes spelt Vishwajit Gupta, born 14 November 1942) is an Indian paleontologist from Punjab University who became infamous for large-scale scientific fraud.

His publishing record based on work purportedly made over 20 years consisting of more than 400 research papers came under scrutiny after an Australian geologist, John Talent, researched his claims and work for nearly nine years so as to make a clear case of fraud. The discovery of the fraud began with Talent and John Pickett, who visited a road cut site in Nepal where Gupta had reported prolific numbers of Devonian conodont fossils. They found no fossils at nearly all the twenty sites he had mentioned but they found one site which yielded a fossil of a Silurian age. They subsequently chanced on his use of the same image in two papers and initially considered the possibility of error by adding the wrong photograph. A more detailed examination showed them that Gupta had used illustrations of fossils that were similar to specimens collected near New York by George Jennings Hinde in 1879. They interviewed coauthors, talked to Gupta on several occasions and made a detailed accusation on the willful nature and scale of fraud after nine years of research. Gupta attempted to respond to the claims by noting the credentials of his coworkers.

The case unravelled with several co-workers realizing that they had been misled and having assumed good faith with a colleague and overlooked obvious contradictions and paradoxical results arising from assuming that Gupta had collected the fossils where he claimed they had been found. A range of other malpractices were also reported including the reuse of specimens which were claimed from various locations, the use of a specimen that was found missing elsewhere and plagiarism of images.

John Talent received death threats from Gupta. In an interview to ABC he went on record to note that a technician in Gupta's department who threatened to reveal details of the fraud was reportedly killed in hit-and-run accident. Talent reported that Gupta had offered money to hitmen to inflict injury on his enemies. The aged mother of one of the Indian co-authors of the report by Talent published by the Senckenberg Museum was hit in a road accident and was seriously injured and broke several ribs.

A four-year enquiry was conducted and Gupta was suspended from the post of director of the Institute of Paleontology at the Panjab University in Chandigarh but was reinstated subsequently following a court order and retired "normally" with super-annuation benefits in 2002.

References

External links
 Thesis published under M.R. Sahni (1966)

Living people
Academic scandals
Indian paleontologists
20th-century Indian biologists
1942 births
Scientists from Punjab, India
Scientists from Chandigarh